The Internet Messaging Program or IMP is a webmail client. It can be used to access e-mail stored on an IMAP server. IMP is written in PHP and a component of the collaborative software suite Horde.

It is included with cPanel and Plesk installations as a webmail client. It often integrates email, calendar, address book, notes, tasks, filters and a newsreader with cPanel.

Internet Messaging Program is free and open-source software subject to the terms of the GPL-2.0-only license.

Current features 

    Dynamic (AJAX) view
    Mobile smartphone view
    Minimal (text-only) view
    HTML message composition with a cross-browser WYSIWYG editor
    Drag/drop attachment support into WYSIWYG editor
    HTML signatures
    High performance
    Robust IMAP support, utilizing advanced server features
    Flexible message search
    Address autocompletion
    Spell checking
    Sending of attachments via download link, instead of embedding in message
    Thread view
    Message previews in mailbox view
    Desktop like user interface and navigation (also via keyboard)
    IMAP folder support
    Management of shared IMAP folders (ACLs)
    Folder subscriptions
    Various identities
    Alias and "tied to" addresses in user identities
    Integration with e-mail filtering
    Integration with addressbook
    Integration with calendar
    S/MIME and PGP based encryption and signatures
    Mailbox quotas
    Ability to forward multiple messages at once
    Download of attachments as ZIP archive
    Stripping of attachments from messages
    Preview of attachments in compose view
    Priority settings for composed messages
    Message flags
    Graphical emoticons and country flags in message view
    Available in many languages
    Full charset support

History
Chuck Hagenbuch published a first version of IMP on Freshmeat in 1998. A constant stream of feature requests not all fitting for a webmail application led to the development of a more generic web application backbone: the Horde framework. The release of IMP 3.0 and Horde 2.0 was the first one with two truly separate components. Since then any deployment of IMP can only run on top of a Horde installation.

SAPO uses IMP to provide several million users with a webmail platform. The company also sponsored the initial development of the dynamic AJAX variant of IMP which was released as a separate package - named DIMP - with the release of Horde 3.2.

Support for mobile clients was provided within 2006 for the first time. At that time a WAP based mobile view was provided by a separate package called MIMP.

With the release of Horde 4.0 the three existing views were collapsed into the original IMP package again. In addition another mobile view for smartphones was added based on the jQuery Mobile JavaScript framework.

See also 
 Horde
 SquirrelMail
 RoundCube

References

External links 
 

Email clients
Web-based email clients for Linux
Free email software
Free software programmed in PHP
Free software webmail